Sphoeroides rosenblatti is a species in the family Tetraodontidae, or pufferfishes.

References

Tetraodontidae
Fish described in 1996